was a town located in Sorachi District, Sorachi Subprefecture, Hokkaido, Japan.

As of 2004, the town had an estimated population of 7,009 and a density of 38.97 persons per km2. The total area was 179.87 km2.

On March 27, 2006, Kurisawa, along with the village of Kita (also from Sorachi District) was merged into the expanded city of Iwamizawa.

Sister city
 Canby, Oregon (from 1987 to present)

External links
 Iwamizawa official website 

Dissolved municipalities of Hokkaido